Penhallow is a hamlet near Perranzabuloe in Cornwall, England. Penhallow is on the A3075 main road one km south of Perranzabuloe village.

References

Hamlets in Cornwall